Abdallah Beyhum also written as Abdullah Bayhum (1879–1962) was a Lebanese politician and the 10th Prime Minister of Lebanon.

He was assigned as acting Prime Minister on 29 January 1934 during the French Mandate, and after two years, 30 January 1936, Ayoub Tabet was sworn in as Prime Minister. However Beyhum became Prime Minister officially on 21 September 1939 forming his cabinet that lasted until 4 April 1941 during the rule of Lebanese President Émile Eddé.

References

Prime Ministers of Lebanon
Lebanese people from the Ottoman Empire
1879 births
1962 deaths
Lebanese Sunni Muslims
Lebanese Sunni politicians